The 1999 World Pool Championship was a professional pool championship that took place in 1999 in Cardiff, Wales. The event was billed as a world championship by Matchroom Sport as an alternative to the World Pool-Billiard Association's 1999 WPA World Nine-ball Championship, won by Nick Varner. Despite there being two world titles for the same discipline in 1999, both are considered as valid in 1999 by the WPA.

The event was won by Efren Reyes, who defeated Chang Hao-ping in the final 17–8. At the time of the event, it was not recognised as a world championship, however, after the event was well received, the WPA worked with Matchroom Sport to sponsor and present later versions of the event, and the 1999 event was retrospectively recognised as a world championship. The championships were merged in 2000, but were also held in Wales.

Knockout round

References

External links
Empire Poker WPA World Pool Championship 2000 at azbilliards.com

WPA World Nine-ball Championship
WPA World Nine-ball Championship
WPA World Nine-ball Championship
International sports competitions hosted by Wales